Liopsetta is a genus of righteye flounders native to the northern oceans.

Species
There are currently two recognized species in this genus:
 Liopsetta glacialis (Pallas, 1776) (Arctic flounder)
 Liopsetta pinnifasciata (Kner, 1870) (Far Eastern smooth flounder)

References

 
Pleuronectidae
Marine fish genera
Taxa named by Theodore Gill